Koeberlinia is a genus of flowering plant. It is the sole genus in the family Koeberliniaceae. Alternately it is treated as a member of the Capparaceae.

Species
Koeberlinia includes two species:

Koeberlinia holacantha W.C. Holmes, K. L. Yip & Rushing - Native to Bolivia
Koeberlinia spinosa Zucc. - Native to the southwestern United States and northern Mexico

References

External links

Brassicales genera
Brassicales
Taxa named by Joseph Gerhard Zuccarini